Hattgenstein is an Ortsgemeinde – a municipality belonging to a Verbandsgemeinde, a kind of collective municipality – in the Birkenfeld district in Rhineland-Palatinate, Germany. It belongs to the Verbandsgemeinde of Birkenfeld, whose seat is in the like-named town.

Geography

Location
The municipality lies at the edge of the Schwarzwälder Hochwald (forest) in the Hunsrück, and 72.2% of the municipal area is wooded. There is a widespread misconception that Hattgenstein, with its average elevation of 534 m above sea level, is the highest place in Rhineland-Palatinate, but this is not true. There are a few places, such as Stein-Neukirch in the High Westerwald and Nürburg in the Eifel, that are higher.

Neighbouring municipalities
To the northeast lies Schwollen, and to the south, Oberhambach.

Constituent communities
Also belonging to Hattgenstein are the outlying homesteads of Helmhof, Waldfriede and Zur Zimmerei.

Politics

Municipal council
The council is made up of 6 council members, who were elected by majority vote at the municipal election held on 7 June 2009, and the honorary mayor as chairman.

Mayor
Hattgenstein’s mayor is Udo Laube, re-elected in 2019.

Coat of arms
The municipality’s arms might in English heraldic language be described thus: Over a base countercompony gules and argent, gules on a mount vert the Hattgenstein Glockenhaus argent with timber framing sable and doors and windows of the field.

Culture and sightseeing

Buildings

The following are listed buildings or sites in Rhineland-Palatinate’s Directory of Cultural Monuments:
 Am Brunnen 2 – Quereinhaus (a combination residential and commercial house divided for these two purposes down the middle, perpendicularly to the street), partly timber-frame, partly slated, late 18th or early 19th century
 Am Brunnen 4 – former winepress house, timber-frame building
 Flurstraße 3 – Quereinhaus, partly timber-frame, possibly from the earlier half of the 19th century
 Hauptstraße 13 – so-called Glockenhaus (“Bell House”); partly timber-frame, half-hipped roof, bell turret, 1762; characterizes village’s appearance
 Hauptstraße 17 – stately Quereinhaus, partly timber-frame, possibly from the early 19th century
 
The Glockenhaus (“Bell House”) is Hattgenstein’s main landmark. It was built in 1762 as a school building and a dwelling for the beadle.

Natural monuments
Hattgensteiner Fels, a crag with a lookout tower near the sporting ground, is believed to be the village’s namesake.

Economy and infrastructure

Transport
To the west runs Bundesstraße 269, and to the south, the Autobahn A 62 (Kaiserslautern–Trier). Available in nearby Neubrücke is a railway station on the Nahe Valley Railway (Bingen–Saarbrücken).

References

External links

 Municipality’s official webpage 

Birkenfeld (district)